"How the Trick Is Done" is a magic realism short story by A.C. Wise. It was first published in Uncanny Magazine in 2019.

Synopsis
A version of the bullet catch trick — one predicated on the magician's girlfriend secretly having the power to raise the dead — goes terribly wrong.

Reception

"How the Trick Is Done" was a finalist for the Nebula Award for Best Short Story of 2019.

References

External links
Text of the story

Works originally published in online magazines